Taisei Marukawa (born 30 January 1997) is a Japanese professional footballer who plays as a winger for Liga 1 club PSIS Semarang.

Career

Early career
Marukawa started his career when he was in high school by joining Hiroshima Minami High School. Then he joined Chuo University from 2015 to 2019.

Senglea Athletic F.C.
Before the second half of 2019–20, Marukawa moved to Malta. He signed one-year contract with Maltese Premier League club Senglea Athletic. He made his debut on 1 February, as a starter in a 1–2 win to Balzan. On 6 April, Marukawa scored his first goal for Senglea Athletic in a 2–2 draw over Ħamrun Spartans at the Hibernians Stadium.

Valletta F.C.
On 26 August 2020, Marukawa signed with Valletta. He made his league debut for Valletta on 21 September 2020 in a 4–2 league win against Birkirkara. and scored his first goal for Valletta in a 1–1 draw over Hibernians at the National Stadium, Ta' Qali.

FC Noah Jurmala
On 29 January 2021, Marukawa moved to Latvia.  He signed one-year contract with Latvian Higher League club Noah Jurmala.

Persebaya Surabaya
In 2021, he signed for Indonesian club Persebaya. On 11 September 2021, Marukawa debuted for Persebaya during a 3–1 win over Persikabo 1973.

On 29 September 2021, Marukawa scored his first league goal for Persebaya with scored a brace in 2021-22 Liga 1, earning them a 1–3 victory over PSS Sleman. On 26 October 2021, Marukawa scored his goal for Persebaya in a match against Persija Jakarta in the 25th minute, playing at the Manahan Stadium, Persebaya was able to steal the full three points after beating Persija with a score of 1–0. This goal became Persebaya's only winning goal and managed to rank 5th in the standings.

PSIS Semarang
On 1 April 2022, Taisei Marukawa moved to PSIS Semarang for the 2022-23 Liga 1. In July 2022, with a market value of 7.82 billion rupiah, he's the most expensive player at PSIS Semarang.

Marukawa made his PSIS Semarang debut in a pre-season friendly against PSM Makassar on 28 May 2022. On 23 July 2022, Marukawa made his league debut by starting in a 1–1 draw against RANS Nusantara. And he also scored his first goal for the team, he scored in the 75th minute from the penalty at the Jatidiri Stadium, Semarang.

Honours

Individual
 Liga 1 Player of the Month: October 2021, December 2021
 Liga 1 Best Player: 2021–22
 Liga 1 Team of the Season: 2021–22
 APPI Indonesian Football Award Best 11: 2021–22
 APPI Indonesian Football Award Best Forward: 2021–22
 APPI Indonesian Football Award Best Footballer: 2021–22

References

External links
 
 

1997 births
Living people
Association football midfielders
Association football wingers
Japanese footballers
Japanese expatriate footballers
Japanese expatriate sportspeople in Malta
Japanese expatriate sportspeople in Latvia
Japanese expatriate sportspeople in Indonesia
Expatriate footballers in Malta
Expatriate footballers in Indonesia
Expatriate footballers in Latvia
Maltese Premier League players
Liga 1 (Indonesia) players
Senglea Athletic F.C. players
Valletta F.C. players
PSIS Semarang players
Persebaya Surabaya players
Sportspeople from Hiroshima
People from Hiroshima